Hobaugh is a surname. Notable people with the surname include:

Charles O. Hobaugh (born 1961), American astronaut
Ed Hobaugh (born 1934), American baseball player